James Tyler Greene (born August 17, 1983) is an American former professional baseball second baseman and shortstop. He played in Major League Baseball (MLB) for the St. Louis Cardinals, Houston Astros, and Chicago White Sox.

Amateur career
Greene was born on August 17, 1983, in Raleigh, North Carolina. He graduated from St. Thomas Aquinas High School in Ft. Lauderdale, FL. He was drafted by Atlanta Braves in the 2nd round of the 2002 MLB draft, but did not sign. He then went on to attend Georgia Tech. In 2004, he played collegiate summer baseball in the Cape Cod Baseball League for the Orleans Cardinals and was named a league all-star.

Greene was the 30th overall pick in the 2005 MLB draft by the Cardinals.

Professional career

St. Louis Cardinals
Greene made his MLB debut on April 30, 2009 against the Washington Nationals in Washington, D.C., when Brendan Ryan was placed on the 15-day disabled list with a strained hamstring.

He hit his first MLB career home run May 8, 2009, against the Cincinnati Reds in the eighth inning off reliever David Weathers. He was recalled on September 23 after the minor league season had ended. He was rated with "Best Infield Arm" in the Cardinals minor league system by Baseball America's Best Tools survey in 2006, 2007, 2008, and 2009.

On September 7, 2010, Greene was recalled by the Cardinals for the stretch run.

Houston Astros
On August 9, 2012, Greene was traded to the Houston Astros.

On March 26, 2013, Greene was released by the Astros.

Chicago White Sox
Greene signed with the Chicago White Sox on April 4, 2013. He then reported to Triple-A and provided infield depth. On April 14, 2013, Tyler was called up to the White Sox after Ángel Sánchez was placed on the DL. He was designated for assignment on June 3, 2013.  On June 6, 2013, Tyler cleared waivers and was sent outright to Charlotte. On August 13, 2013, Greene was released.

Atlanta Braves
Greene signed a minor league deal with the Atlanta Braves on August 17, 2013 and was assigned to Class AAA Gwinnett.

On January 13, 2014, he was invited to spring training.

San Diego Padres
Greene was acquired by the San Diego Padres on April 22, 2014.

Philadelphia Phillies
Greene signed a minor league deal with the Phillies in January 2015. The deal did not include an invite to major league spring training. He was released on April 4.

References

External links

Greene player profile page at Scout.com

1983 births
Living people
All-American college baseball players
Baseball players at the 2003 Pan American Games
Baseball players from Florida
Charlotte Knights players
Chicago White Sox players
El Paso Chihuahuas players
Georgia Tech Yellow Jackets baseball players
Gwinnett Braves players
Houston Astros players
Major League Baseball shortstops
Memphis Redbirds players
Navegantes del Magallanes players
American expatriate baseball players in Venezuela
New Jersey Cardinals players
Orleans Firebirds players
Palm Beach Cardinals players
Pan American Games medalists in baseball
Pan American Games silver medalists for the United States
Baseball players from Raleigh, North Carolina
Springfield Cardinals players
St. Louis Cardinals players
Swing of the Quad Cities players
United States national baseball team players
Medalists at the 2003 Pan American Games
St. Thomas Aquinas High School (Florida) alumni